Amith Chakalakkal Saju, known as Amith Chakalakkal, is an Indian film actor in Malayalam Cinema. He lives in Kochi, Kerala. He is known for his roles in the movie Honey Bee and Vaarikkuzhiyile Kolapathakam

Early life and education 
Chakalakkal was born on 13 August 1985. He studied in Rajagiri High School, Kalamassery, Kochi (class of 2002). He has a bachelor's degree in mechanical engineering. He paved his way into modeling through the TV reality show "Mammootty The Best Actor Award", in Asianet.

Career 
Chakalakkal was first featured in an album, Atma, in the song "Mounam Melle" along with Pushpa Mathew. He broke into films after his stint on the reality show Mammootty, the best actor award.

He first appeared in ABCD as a junior artist. His first character role in Jean Paul Lal's directorial debut, Honey Bee. He played the role of Nizam Rowther in the 2014 Indian Malayalam-language period thriller film, Iyobinte Pusthakam. The following year, he acted in Lal Bahadur Shastri and Sapthamashree Thaskaraha. He was well received and appreciated for his portrayal of Prince Chakkalakkal in the movie C/O Saira Banu. He made his first lead role in the movie Melle. In 2018, he performed a key role in Jayasurya-starrer Pretham 2. In 2019, he starred in the lead role in the thriller movie Vaarikkuzhiyile Kolapaathakam, with his portrayal of a young hotheaded priest earning him praise.

Filmography

References

Male actors in Malayalam cinema
1985 births
Living people
21st-century Indian male actors
Male actors from Kerala
People from Kochi